Fire in the Hole is the fifth album from hip hop group Brand Nubian, their second reunion album, released six years after Foundation.

Track listing

Charts

References 

2004 albums
Brand Nubian albums
Babygrande Records albums